About Time is the debut solo studio album released by British R&B singer Angel. The album was released in Ireland on 12 April 2013 and in the UK on 15 April via Island and Universal Republic.

Background
The release of the album was announced in January 2013, a month after the release of the single "Time After Time". On 16 March 2013, the release date of 15 April 2013 was confirmed via Facebook. The album includes guest appearances from the likes of British rapper Wretch 32, British DJ Trevor Nelson, American rapper Notorious B.I.G., Finnish band H.I.M, rapper Wizkid, and British soul singer Shakka. The album produced five singles: including four before the release, and one after. The track "Julie", released as Angel's debut single and initially due to appear on the album, was cut in favour of new material. The album debuted at #33 on the UK Albums Chart. A total of fifteen non-album tracks were released to the iTunes Store prior to the album's release, contained within three EPs, and B-sides to the album's singles.

Singles
 "Julie" was initially released as the album's lead single on 30 May 2010, was eventually cut from the album in favour of new material. The single was released on Parallel records prior to Angel singing with Universal Island. The music video for the track is available to download from the iTunes Store.
 "Go In, Go Hard", featuring British rapper Wretch 32, was released as the album's lead single on 18 March 2012, appearing only on the deluxe edition, peaking at #41 on the UK Singles Chart and #14 in the UK R&B Chart. The single features the B-side "Ride Out", featuring rapper Sneakbo, which also appears as a bonus track on the deluxe edition of the album. A music video was also filmed for "Ride Out", premiering seven days after "Go In, Go Hard".
 "Wonderful" was released as the album's second single on 15 July 2012, achieving better success, peaking at #9 on the UK Singles Chart. The single features the B-side "How Can I Lose" featuring British rapper Chip. A music video was filmed for the B-side, featuring a guest appearance from Chip.
 "Time After Time" was released as the album's third single on 29 November 2012, again peaking at number at #41 on the UK Singles Chart. The single features the B-side "Ride or Die", featuring former X Factor contestant and British rapper Misha B. "Ride or Die" had a music video filmed for it, directed by actor and rapper Adam Deacon, who also co-stars in the video.
 "The World" was released as the album's fourth single on 5 April 2013. The music video for the track premiered on 7 February 2013. It failed to chart within the top 40 of the UK Singles Chart and peaked at number 73, becoming the album's and Angel's least-successful single. It was Angel's first single not to feature a B-side.
 "Rocket Love" was released as a promotional single on 15 April 2013, via the iTunes Store, becoming the first promotional single from the album. A music video was filmed for the track, being the only track on the album not to be produced by Parallel or Peter Ighile, and instead being produced by Midi Mafia.
 Music videos for the tracks "Paid in Full", "More Fire", "Blown Away" and "Secrets" was also filmed and released, premiering on 17 April, 20 April, 3 May and 15 May respectively, with each of the tracks being promoted as the iTunes Store download of the day.

Track listing

Chart

Release history

References

2013 debut albums
Universal Republic Records albums
Island Records albums
Contemporary R&B albums by English artists